A Men's club throw event for wheelchair athletes in classes F32 and F51 was held at the 2004 Summer Paralympics in the Athens Olympic Stadium. It was won by Stephen Miller, representing , who competes in class F32.

Result

21 Sept. 2004, 09:30

References

M
2004